Joseph Birch may refer to:

Joe Birch (1904–1980), English footballer
Sir Joseph Birch, 1st Baronet (1755–1833), merchant and MP for Nottingham and Ludgershall

See also
Birch (surname)